Syrnola is a genus of sea snails, marine gastropod mollusks in the subfamily Turbonillinae of the family Pyramidellidae, the pyrams and their allies.

General description
The species in Syrnola are medium-sized and slender. Their shell is subulate and polished, marked by fine lines of growth and microscopic spiral striations. It doesn't contain an umbilicus. The whorls of the teleoconch are flattened and increasing regularly in size. The suture is well marked. The aperture is suboval. The outer lip is simple. They possess only one columellar fold.

Species
Species within the genus Syrnola include:

 Syrnola acerrima Watson, 1886
 † Syrnola aclyformis Marwick, 1929 
 Syrnola acusbifasciata Peñas & Rolán, 2016
 Syrnola acusgradata Peñas & Rolán, 2016
 Syrnola acutissima Peñas & Rolán, 2016
 Syrnola adamsi (Tryon, 1886) 
 Syrnola adventicia Peñas & Rolán, 2016
 Syrnola aganea (Bartsch, 1915)
 Syrnola altapex Peñas & Rolán, 2016
 Syrnola ambagiosa Melvill, 1904
 Syrnola angasi (Tryon, 1886)
 † Syrnola angulifera (Laws, 1937) 
 Syrnola angusta Laseron, 1951 (accepted > unreplaced junior homonym, secondary homonym of Syrnola angusta (Deshayes, 1861))
 Syrnola aperanta Melvill, 1906
 Syrnola apollinis Thiele, 1925
 Syrnola arae Peñas & Rolán, 2002
 Syrnola arcta (Deshayes, 1861) †
 Syrnola arundo Peñas & Rolán, 2016
 Syrnola attenuata (Dall, 1892)
 Syrnola aurantiaca Angas, 1867
 Syrnola azona Nomura, 1937
 Syrnola baygiongina Saurin, 1959
 Syrnola bifasciata Tenison-Woods, 1875
 Syrnola bizonalis A. Adams, 1860
 Syrnola cani Saurin, 1959
 Syrnola capensis (G.B. Sowerby III, 1892)
 † Syrnola carinulata Cossmann, 1888 
 Syrnola celestae Saurin, 1959
 Syrnola cinctella (Adams A., 1860)
 Syrnola clavellosa Melvill, 1906
 Syrnola clearete Melvill, 1910
 † Syrnola climacina Cossmann, 1888 
 † Syrnola cloczi Cossmann, 1896 
 Syrnola collea (Bartsch, 1926)
 Syrnola columnella A. Adams, 1863
 †  Syrnola concinna (Sorgenfrei, 1958) 
 † Syrnola conulus Cossmann, 1888 
 Syrnola convexa Laseron, 1951
 Syrnola convoluta (Watson, 1886)
 Syrnola crawfordi Powell, 1927
 Syrnola crocata (A. Adams, 1865)
 Syrnola cuspidata (Garrett, 1873)
 Syrnola cylindrella A. Adams, 1863
 Syrnola daedala A. Adams, 1863
 Syrnola densestriata (Garrett, 1873)
 Syrnola dianae Thiele, 1925
 Syrnola dissociata Peñas & Rolán, 2016
 Syrnola elegans (A. Adams, 1854)
 Syrnola endolamellata (Schander, 1994)
 Syrnola erecta Peñas & Rolán, 2016
 Syrnola eruca Laseron, 1959
 Syrnola etiennei (Dautzenberg, 1912)
 Syrnola exploratorum Peñas & Rolán, 2016
 Syrnola exserta Laseron, 1959
 Syrnola exsulcata Peñas & Rolán, 2016
 Syrnola fasciata Jickeli, 1882
 Syrnola fernandina (Bartsch, 1927)
 Syrnola filiformis Peñas & Rolán, 2016
 Syrnola finitima Peñas & Rolán, 2016
 Syrnola floridana (Bartsch, 1927)
 Syrnola georgiana (Bartsch, 1927)
 Syrnola gigantea Peñas & Rolán, 2016
 † Syrnola goniophora Cossmann, 1888 
 Syrnola gracillima A. Adams, 1860
 Syrnola hanzawai Nomura, 1939
 Syrnola hasimotoi Nomura, 1937
 Syrnola hera (Bartsch, 1915)
 † Syrnola houdasi Cossmann, 1907 
 Syrnola interpressa Peñas & Rolán, 2016
 Syrnola intraliciata Peñas & Rolán, 2016
 Syrnola irregularis Peñas & Rolán, 2016
 † Syrnola irrevocata Laws, 1937 
 Syrnola jacksonensis Laseron, 1951
 Syrnola jovis Thiele, 1925
 Syrnola junonis Thiele, 1925
 Syrnola karachiensis Melvill, 1897
 Syrnola kesenensis Nomura, 1938
 Syrnola lactea A. Adams, 1863
 Syrnola lamothei (Dautzenberg, 1912)
 Syrnola lanassae Hornung & Mermod, 1924
 Syrnola lanceata Peñas, Rolán & Swinnen, 2014
 Syrnola lata Laseron, 1951
 Syrnola lendix (Adams, 1863)
 Syrnla lepidula A. Adams, 1860
 Syrnola longiaperturata Nomura, 1938
 Syrnola longiuscula Peñas & Rolán, 2016
 † Syrnola lutosa Marwick, 1931
 Syrnola macella Saurin, 1962
 Syrnola macrocephala Hedley, 1903
 Syrnola magnusdens Peñas & Rolán, 2016
 Syrnola manifesta Hedley, 1912
 Syrnola manilensis Boettger, 1896
 Syrnola marquesensis Peñas & Rolán, 2016
 Syrnola massauensis Hornung & Mermod, 1924
 Syrnola mekranica Melvill & Standen, 1901
 Syrnola menda Finlay, 1926
 Syrnola mera A. Adams, 1860
 Syrnola mercurii Thiele, 1925
 Syrnola metria Melvill, 1896
 Syrnola michaeli Tenison-Woods, 1877
 † Syrnola microstoma (Deshayes, 1862) 
 Syrnola minervae Thiele, 1925
 Syrnola minusgradata Peñas & Rolán, 2016
 Syrnola minuta Adams H., 1869
 Syrnola modica (G.B. Sowerby II, 1865)
 Syrnola monteiroi Peñas & Rolán, 2016
 Syrnola mussandamica Melvill & Standen, 1903
 Syrnola mutabilis Peñas & Rolán, 2016
 Syrnola neglecta Saurin, 1959
 Syrnola neptuni Thiele, 1925
 † Syrnola neumayri (Koenen, 1882) 
 † Syrnola nitida (Melleville, 1843) 
 Syrnola obeliscus (Garrett, 1873)
 † Syrnola obesula (Deshayes, 1862) 
 Syrnola parda Peñas & Rolán, 2016
 Syrnola pergradata Peñas & Rolán, 2016
 Syrnola pervulgata Peñas & Rolán, 2016
 †Syrnola pissarroi Cossmann, 1902 
 Syrnola pistillum A. Adams, 1863
  †Syrnola polygyrata (Deshayes, 1861)
 Syrnola praecostulata Saurin, 1959
 †Syrnola praelonga (Deshayes, 1861) 
 Syrnola producta (C. B. Adams, 1840)
 Syrnola proserpinae Thiele, 1925
 Syrnola proxima Peñas & Rolán, 2016
 Syrnola pulchra Brazier, 1877
 Syrnola pumilio (E. A. Smith, 1890)
 Syrnola pupina A. Adams, 1860
 Syrnola pyramidalis A. Adams, 1860
 Syrnola pyrrha (Bartsch, 1915)
 Syrnola quaelibet Saurin, 1959
 † Syrnola riddollsi Maxwell, 1992
 † Syrnola rodata (Laws, 1940) 
 Syrnola rubrofasciata Peñas & Rolán, 2016
 Syrnola sansibarica Thiele, 1925
 † Syrnola sculptilis Laws, 1937 
 Syrnola simulans Peñas & Rolán, 2016
 Syrnola siogamensis Nomura, 1936
 Syrnola solanderiana Laseron, 1959
 Syrnola solomonensis Peñas & Rolán, 2016
 † Syrnola spiculum (Deshayes, 1861) 
 † Syrnola spina (Deshayes, 1824) 
 Syrnola spiniformis Peñas & Rolán, 2016
 Syrnola striatula (A. Adams, 1854)
 Syrnola strigulata (A. Adams, 1863)
 Syrnola subcinctella Nomura, 1936
 Syrnola subula Gould, 1861
 Syrnola subuliformis (A. Adams, 1863)
 Syrnola subulina A. Adams, 1863
  † Syrnola sulcifera Laws, 1937
 Syrnola susakiensis Nomura, 1939
 Syrnola sutuproelon Peñas & Rolán, 2016
 Syrnola taeniata (A. Adams, 1863)
 Syrnola take Nomura, 1938
 Syrnola teretiuscula A. Adams, 1860
 † Syrnola thelma Dall 1913
 Syrnola thielei (Dautzenberg, 1912)
 Syrnola thomensis Tomlin & Shackleford, 1915 
 Syrnola tincta Angas, 1871
 Syrnola torresiana Laseron, 1959
 Syrnola trivittata Sturany, 1903 
 Syrnola tubiformis Peñas & Rolán, 2016
 † Syrnola turoniensis (Glibert, 1949) 
 Syrnola unilineata (Garrett, 1873)
 Syrnola vanhareni (van Aartsen, Gittenberger & Goud, 1998)
 Syrnola vanhyningi (Bartsch, 1944)
 Syrnola veneris Thiele, 1925
 Syrnola violacea Melvill & Standen, 1896 
 Syrnola vitrea A. Adams, 1860
 Syrnola vulcani Thiele, 1925
 † Syrnola waiauica (Laws, 1937) 
 † Syrnola wallacei Marwick, 1929 
 Syrnola zona Nomura, 1937

Synonyms
 Syrnola aurantia (Petterd, 1884): synonym of Syrnola aurantiaca (Angas, 1867) (junior synonym)
 Syrnola bacillum Pilsbry, 1901: synonym of Tibersyrnola bacillum (Pilsbry, 1901)
 Syrnola bedoti Hornung & Mermod, 1924: synonym of Megastomia bedoti (Hornung & Mermod, 1924)
  † Syrnola bernayi Cossmann, 1888: synonym of  † Cossmannica bernayi (Cossmann, 1888) (superseded combination)
 † Syrnola briarti Cossmann, 1888: synonym of † Odostomia briarti (Cossmann, 1888) (superseded combinati
 Syrnola broti Hornung & Mermod, 1924: synonym of Megastomia broti (Hornung & Mermod, 1924)
 Syrnola brunnea (A. Adams, 1854): synonym of Colsyrnola brunnea (A. Adams, 1854)
 Syrnola callembryon Dautzenberg & Fischer, 1907: synonym of Puposyrnola callembryon (Dautzenberg & H. Fischer, 1907)
 Syrnola canaria (Hedley, 1907): synonym of Megastomia canaria (Hedley, 1907)
 Syrnola candida (de Folin, 1870): synonym of Syrnola etiennei (Dautzenberg, 1912)
 Syrnola cerullii Cossmann, 1916: synonym of Eulimella cerullii (Cossmann, 1916)
 Syrnola charpenteri Hornung & Mermod, 1924: synonym of Marginodostomia charpenteri (Hornung & Mermod, 1924)
 Syrnola cincta Fenaux, 1942: synonym of Tibersyrnola unifasciata (Forbes, 1844)
 Syrnola cinnamomea (A. Adams, 1863): synonym of Tibersyrnola cinnamomea (A. Adams, 1863)
 † Syrnola emarginata Cossmann, 1888: synonym of † Cossmannica emarginata (Cossmann, 1888) (superseded combination)
 † Syrnola finlayi (Laws, 1937): synonym of † Finlayola finlayi Laws, 1937
 Syrnola gestroi Hornung & Mermod, 1924: synonym of Megastomia gestroi (Hornung & Mermod, 1924)
 Syrnola hanagaiensis Nomura, 1938: synonym of Derjuginella rufofasciata (E.A. Smith, 1875)
 Syrnola harrissoni Tate & May, 1900: synonym of Koloonella harrissoni (Tate & May, 1900) (original combination)
 Syrnola inturbida Yokoyama, 1927: synonym of Puposyrnola inturbida (Yokoyama, 1927) (original combination)
 Syrnola jaculum Melvill & Standen, 1896: synonym of Styloptygma jaculum (Melvill & Standen, 1896)
 Syrnola lacteola (Preston, 1904): synonym of Styloptygma lacteola Preston, 1903
 Syrnola lata Laseron, 1951: synonym of Syrnola aurantiaca (Angas, 1867) (junior synonym)
  † Syrnola lawsi Powell, 1934: synonym of  † Tibersyrnola lawsi (Powell, 1934)
 Syrnola lorioli Hornung & Mermod, 1924: synonym of Odostomia lorioli (Hornung & Mermod, 1924)
 Syrnola lurida (Suter, 1908): synonym of Finlayola lurida (Suter, 1908)
 † Syrnola mestayerae Marwick, 1931: synonym of † Eulimella mestayerae (Marwick, 1931)  (original combination)
 Syrnola metcalfei (Pritchard & Gatliff, 1900): synonym of Odostomia metcalfei Pritchard & Gatliff, 1900
 Syrnola minor E. A. Smith, 1904: synonym of Pyramidella minor (E. A. Smith, 1904)
 Syrnola mossiana Melvill & Standen, 1895: synonym of Odostomia lutea Garrett, 1873
 Syrnola nitidula A. Adams, 1860: synonym of Tiberia nitidula (A. Adams, 1860)
 † Syrnola otaioensis (Laws, 1937): synonym of † Finlayola otaioensis Laws, 1937
 Syrnola petterdi Tate & May, 1900: synonym of Agatha petterdi (Gatliff, 1900) (secondary junior homonym of Syrnola tasmanica (Tenison-Woods, 1877), Odostomia petterdi is a replacement name)
 † Syrnola plicifera Cossmann, 1902: synonym of † Tropaeas plicifera (Cossmann, 1902)  (superseded combination)
 † Syrnola pupoides Cossmann, 1888: synonym of † Tropaeas pupoides (Cossmann, 1888) ( superseded combination)
 † Syrnola semiconcava P. Marshall & Murdoch, 1923 synonym of † Tibersyrnola semiconcava (P. Marshall & Murdoch, 1923) 
 Syrnola serotina A. Adams, 1863: synonym of Tibersyrnola serotina (A. Adams, 1863)
 Syrnola simplex (Angas, 1871): synonym of  Megastomia simplex (Angas, 1871)
 Syrnola solidula (Dunker, 1860): synonym of Pyramidella solidula (Dunker, 1860)
 † Syrnola spargana Cossmann, 1896: synonym of † Cossmannica spargana (Cossmann, 1896)  (uperseded combination)
 Syrnola striatula (Jeffreys, 1856): synonym of Ebala striatula (Jeffreys, 1856)
 Syrnola tarpeia Bartsch, 1915: synonym of Pyramidella tarpeia Bartsch, 1915  (taxon inquirendum)
 Syrnola tenuisculpta (Lischke, 1872): synonym of Iphiana tenuisculpta (Lischke, 1872)
 † Syrnola tepikiensis Powell, 1934: synonym of † Tibersyrnola tepikiensis (Powell, 1934) 
 Syrnola unifasciata (Forbes, 1844): synonym of Eulimella unifasciata (Forbes, 1844)
 Syrnola vietnamica Saurin, 1959: synonym of Syrnola elegans (A. Adams, 1854)
 † Syrnola vixornata Marwick, 1931: synonym of † Odostomia vixornata (Marwick, 1931) (original combination)
 † Syrnola waihoraensis Marwick, 1931: synonym of † Eulimella waihoraensis (Marwick, 1931) (original combination)
 † Syrnola waipaoa Marwick, 1931: synonym of † Odostomia waipaoa (Marwick, 1931) 
 Syrnola wenzi Nordsieck, 1972: synonym of Tibersyrnola unifasciata (Forbes, 1844)

References

 Spencer, H.G., Marshall, B.A. & Willan, R.C. (2009). Checklist of New Zealand living Mollusca. pp 196–219. in: Gordon, D.P. (ed.) New Zealand inventory of biodiversity. Volume one. Kingdom Animalia: Radiata, Lophotrochozoa, Deuterostomia. Canterbury University Press, Christchurch.
 Robba, E. (2013). Tertiary and Quaternary fossil pyramidelloidean gastropods of Indonesia. Scripta Geologica. 144: 1–191.

External links
 Miocene Gastropods and Biostratigraphy of the Kern River Area, California; United States Geological Survey Professional Paper 642 
 Dall, W. H. (1890-1903). Contributions to the Tertiary fauna of Florida with especial reference to the Miocene silex-beds of Tampa and the Pliocene beds of the Caloosahatchie River. Transactions of the Wagner Free Institute of Science. 3(1)

Pyramidellidae